Maria Andreevna Perestyak (born July 27, 1991, in Krasnoyarsk ) is a Russian rugby player. She plays as a striker of the Zilant team, and the Russian national rugby sevens team. She was 2013 Universiade Champion, 2013 European champion, 2016 European champion, 2017 European champion, and 2018 European champion. She was awarded Master of Sports of Russia of international class, and Honored Master of Sports of Russia .

Career 
At the age of 19, she joined the Yenisei-STM rugby club in Krasnoyarsk. After several matches in her first championship, She received a call to the national team from Pavel Baranovsky. In 2013, she won the title of the Universiade rugby sevens champion, as part of the Russian national team. and the title of European champion, and also reached the quarterfinals of the World Cup in Moscow . At the matches of the European Championship, she was mostly in reserve, and did not play at the World Cup .

In 2014, while training in China, she suffered a leg fracture, but soon returned to rugby and continued to play. As part of the Russian team, she won the European Championships in 2016, 2017 and 2018, but did not qualify for the Olympics in Rio de Janeiro. Third medalist of the 1st round of the World Rugby Sevens Series in Dubai 2013. In 2018, she was recognized as the best rugby player of the year in Russia.

Family 
She lives in Krasnoyarsk. with her husband, Vladislav Perestyak, rugby player; they have a son.

References 

1991 births
Russian rugby sevens players
Living people